The 2012–13 season is Hyderabad cricket team's 79th competitive season. The Hyderabad cricket team is senior men's domestic cricket team based in the city of Hyderabad, India, run by the Hyderabad Cricket Association. They represent the region of Telangana in the state of Andhra Pradesh in domestic competitions.

Competition Overview

Squads
 Head Coach : Sunil Joshi
 Fielding Coach : Noel David

 Irani Cup
Ojha got selected to the Rest of India squad for the 2012 Irani Cup, a first-class cricket competition in India.

NKP Salve Challenger Trophy
Ojha got selected to the India A squad for the 2012-13 NKP Salve Challenger Trophy, a List-A cricket tournament in India.

Duleep Trophy
Akshath got selected to the South Zone squad for the 2012-13 Duleep Trophy, a first-class cricket tournament in India.

 Irani Cup
Ojha got selected to the Rest of India squad for the 2013 Irani Cup, a first-class cricket competition in India.

Deodhar Trophy
Ashish and Vihari got selected to the South Zone squad for the 2012-13 Deodhar Trophy, a List-A cricket competition in India.

Indian Premier League
The newly formed local franchise, Sunrisers Hyderabad, which replaced the previous franchise, Deccan Chargers, retained 20 of its players including the Hyderabad's Bhandari, Akshath, Ravi Teja and Ashish and later signed Vihari in the player's draft while Ojha got retained by the Mumbai Indians and Suman got signed by the Pune Warriors for the 2013 Indian Premier League, a professional Twenty20 cricket league in India.

Ranji Trophy

The squad for the Ranji Trophy, the premier first-class cricket tournament in India, was announced on 21 October 2012 with V. V. S. Laxman, who recently announced his retirement from the international cricket, leading the Hyderabad. The Hyderabad began their campaign in the Ranji Trophy with a loss against the Punjab at Mohali on 2 November 2012. They finished at the bottom of the Group A with no wins, six draws and two losses and got relegated to the Group C for the 2013–14 Ranji Trophy.

Points Table
Group A

  Top three teams advanced to knockout stage.
  Bottom team relegated to Group C for 2013–14 Ranji Trophy.
 Points system : Win by an innings or 10 wickets = 7, Win = 6, Draw with first innings lead = 3, Draw with first innings deficit = 1, No Result = 1, Loss = 0.

Matches
Group Stage

Statistics
Most runs

 Source: Cricinfo
Most wickets

 Source: Cricinfo

Vijay Hazare Trophy
The Hyderabad team, led by Pragyan Ojha, began their campaign in the Vijay Hazare Trophy, a List-A cricket tournament in India, with a loss against the Kerala at Vasco da Gama on 14 February 2013. The Kerala pacers, Sandeep Warrier and Prasanth Parameswaran troubled the Hyderabad and restricted them to 192 while 93-run knock from Rohan Prem helped the Kerala complete a six-wicket victory. In the second match, Ojha and Ashish Reddy restricted the Andhra to 202 but the Hyderabad top-order stumbled to Syed Shahabuddin before Hanuma Vihari and Habeeb Ahmed tried to recover the innings. But, their dismissals set up the win for the Andhra as Paidikalva Vijaykumar wrapped things up to defeat the Hyderabad by two runs. In a rain-hit 25-over match, Dwaraka Ravi Teja's 111 and Akash Bhandari's 78 helped the Hyderabad register an eight-wicket win by chasing the Goa's target of 226 that was set with the help of half-centuries from Swapnil Asnodkar and Sagun Kamat. The centuries from Robin Uthappa and K. L. Rahul helped the Karnataka post 305 while the four-wicket haul from S. L. Akshay helped them to recover from the 140-run partnership between Vihari and Bavanaka Sandeep and defeat the Hyderabad by 47 runs in their fourth match. In the final zonal match, century from Dinesh Karthik set a strong start for Tamil Nadu but Chama Milind struck twice to restrict Tamil Nadu to 262. The Hyderabad started the chase strongly but three run-outs in the middle and Palani Amarnath's three-wicket haul at the end hampered the Hyderabad's chase and helped the Tamil Nadu win by 26 runs as the Hyderabad finished fifth in the South Zone and failed to qualify for the knockout stage with a win and four losses.

Points Table
South Zone

Matches
Zonal Stage

Statistics
Most runs

 Source: Cricinfo
Most wickets

 Source: Cricinfo

Syed Mushtaq Ali Trophy
The Hyderabad team, led by Akshath Reddy, began their campaign in the Syed Mushtaq Ali Trophy, a Twenty20 tournament in India, with a loss against the Kerala at Shimoga on 17 March 2013. Two run-outs and disciplined bowling by the Kerala restricted the Hyderabad to 133 while Nikhilesh Surendran's half-century anchored the chase as the Kerala won by six-wickets. In the second match, the 108-run partnership between Akshath and Tirumalasetti Suman set the platform for the Hyderabad for a big total only to be hampered by the four-wicket haul from Tekkami Atchuta Rao and restricted them to 161 while the collective batting effort from the Andhra batsmen helped the Andhra complete the chase with five-wickets to spare. In the third match, the Hyderabad bowlers started strongly dismissing the Goa openers cheaply but the knocks from Swapnil Asnodkar and Ravikant Shukla helped them to recover to 141 while Darshan Misal and his bowling unit restricted the Hyderabad to 134 and win the match for the Goa by 7 runs. Mayank Agarwal's maiden ton and four-wicket hauls from Krishnappa Gowtham and Manish Pandey set up the Karnataka's 12-run win and hand over the fourth loss for the Hyderabad in as many matches. The collective effort from Suman, Bavanaka Sandeep and Hanuma Vihari helped the Hyderabad set the target of 168 while the three-wicket haul from Akash Bhandari in the middle and Chama Milind's hat-trick at the end helped the Hyderabad secure their first win in the tournament against the Tamil Nadu by eight runs as they finished fifth in the South Zone and failed to qualify for the Super League stage with a win and four losses.

Points Table
South Zone

  Top two teams advanced to the Super League.
 Points system : W = 4, T/NR = 2, L = 0.

Matches
Zonal Stage

Statistics
Most runs

 Source: Cricinfo
Most wickets

 Source: Cricinfo

See also
Hyderabad cricket team 
Hyderabad Cricket Association

References

External links
Hyderabad cricket team official site

Cricket in Hyderabad, India
Cricket in Telangana
Sport in Telangana